The Gardermoen Line is a high-speed railway line between Oslo and Eidsvoll, Norway, running past Lillestrøm and Oslo Airport, Gardermoen. The older Hoved Line now handles commuter and freight traffic, while the Gardermoen Line handles high-speed passenger trains and freight trains laden with jet fuel for the airport. Both lines are owned by Bane NOR.

The line was opened in 1998, at the same time as the airport that gave the line its name. It is used by the Flytoget airport express train service as well as express trains by Vy. Most of the line between Oslo and Lillestrøm is through the  Romeriksporten tunnel—the second longest railway tunnel in Norway. The decision to build the line was made in 1992; construction started two years later. The line was subjected to severe criticism during construction when the Romerike Tunnel sprung severe leaks due to hurried construction. As a result, the tunnel was opened a year after the rest of the line.

History 

When the Parliament of Norway decided on 8 October 1992 to build a new central airport for Eastern Norway, they also decided that the main mode of ground transport to the airport should be by railway. While the previous airport, Oslo Airport, Fornebu, was located just outside the city limits; the new Oslo Airport, Gardermoen, would be located some 50 kilometers north of the city, outside the reach of the existing public transport systems. The political agreement to build the airport stated that the costs of construction should not be borne by the tax payers. As a result, the entire airport was financed with money borrowed through Oslo Lufthavn AS, a subsidiary of the Norwegian Airport Administration. The same principle was chosen for the airport rail link. The Norwegian State Railways (NSB) created the subsidiary, NSB Gardermobanen AS, on 24 November 1992 to perform the construction of the line. This company would be able to charge train operators using the railway line; and could use this income to cover its down payments and interest on the debt created to pay for the infrastructure investment. It was planned to give a profit margin of 7.5%.

In 1996 NSB Gardermoen stated that they expected to charge commuter and intercity trains 100 million Norwegian krone per year to use the new line. County politicians in Akershus stated that it was not reasonable for commuters to have to pay for the new railway. Early estimates showed that this would almost double to price from Oslo to Eidsvoll, and that passengers would have different prices, depending on which route they followed. Stor-Oslo Lokaltrafikk, which was responsible for buses in Akershus, stated that they had no way to influence NSB's prices, but that they would consider starting a coach service along the route, which would not charge the surcharge.

Construction 
Construction of the railway started on 1 August 1994. A different right-of-way had to be chosen north of Kløfta. The Hoved Line has heavy traffic, with many small stops until Lillestrøm, and continues northwards from Lillestrøm as single track. Therefore, an all-new railway would have to be built; it would bypass the intermediate railway until Lillestrøm, running through a tunnel, and continue northwards to the airport and onwards to Eidsvoll. This northernmost part is  used to allow trains operating on the Dovre Line to Lillehammer and Trondheim to use the Gardermoen Line.

The Gardermoen Line was the second attempt to build a high-speed railway in Norway. The first was the  line from Ski to Moss on the Østfold Line. However, operational speeds in excess of  could not be achieved due to the short distances and limitations on rolling stock. The Gardermoen Line, therefore, became the first real high-speed railway line in Norway. Due to the domination of single track in Norway, the  Gardermoen Line increased the total length of double track in the kingdom by more than 50%.

The projected costs of the railway line were NOK 4.3 billion ±20%. Total costs ended at NOK 7.7 billion, including 1.3 billion extra used on extraordinary expenditures on the Romeriksporten. On 1 October 1996 it was decided that the construction company, NSB Gardermobanen, would also become the operator of the airport express train. However, due to limited profitability with the company, from 1 January 2001 the ownership of Gardermobanen was transferred to the Norwegian National Rail Administration, who also owns the rest of railway lines in Norway. The operating company changed its name to Flytoget AS.

Construction challenges 

The most challenging part of the construction was the  railway tunnel from Etterstad, just east of Oslo S, to Lillestrøm. Romeriksporten is the longest railway tunnel in Norway, and is underneath the recreational area Østmarka, in geologically highly unstable ground. During the construction in 1997, the water level in some of the lakes above the tunnel, including Lutvann and Nordre Puttjern, fell dramatically. After they were discovered on 3 February 1997 sanctions were initiated by the Norwegian Water Resources and Energy Directorate requiring leakage prevention measures in the tunnel. At the worst, 3,000 liters of water per minute leaked into the tunnel.

The substance Rhoca-Gil was used to fix the leakages, but the substance failed to work properly. Not only did it fail to polymerize and stop the leaks, it also contaminated the surroundings with acrylamide. The entire process of fixing the leak and cleaning up the toxicity delayed the process of building the tunnel by one year; and it was first opened on 22 August 1999. Further complications arose due to conflicts between NSB Gardermobanen and the construction company. Retrospective surveys showed a lack of control and reporting procedures during incidents that should have been addressed in 1995, and were never taken seriously. About sixty houses received damage due to the construction of the tunnel. An evaluation performed by the Ministry of Transport and Communications showed that NOK 500 million was used on fixing the leaks; however, the report claimed this was, to a large extent, a waste of money due to inefficient engineering procedures. The same report criticized the planning and organization of the entire construction of the railway.

Opening 
When the new airport opened on 8 October 1998, and the Flytoget airport express train service started operations with sixteen Type 71 multiple units. Trains had to use the old Hoved Line from Oslo S to Lillestrøm, but could use the new high-speed line from Lillestrøm to Gardermoen. Regular operations using Romeriksporten started on 22 August 1999. To be able to use the new Gardermoen Line infrastructure, Norges Statsbaner had to buy new trains capable of higher speeds. Twenty-two locomotive designated El 18, based on the Swiss lok 2000, where delivered in 1996. Full speed utilization of long-distance trains is only possible with the Type 73 units that started operation on the Dovre Line in 2000. They are equipped with tilting technology allowing quicker operation on the rest of the line to Trondheim.

Future expansion 
Plans for an expansion of the high-speed line to Hamar have been launched, but have not been incorporated into any specific plans. This suggestion would increase the length of the high-speed rail north of Oslo with —almost a doubling. The project may or may not incorporate a further high-speed line to Trondheim.

Operations 
The railway is used by both Vy, Flytoget and SJ for their passenger services, as well as freight trains with jet fuel for the airport.

Airport express train 

The Flytoget airport express train service is the largest user of the Gardermoen Line, with six departures from Oslo Central to Oslo Airport per hour. The trains only use the line as far as Gardermoen, and not the northernmost sixteen kilometers. Service is provided using sixteen Type 71 three-car units, which together transported 5.4 million passengers in 2007. Direct services to Oslo S take 19 minutes. Half of the services make an intermediate stop at Lillestrøm, and continue on past Oslo Central to Asker Station. Flytoget has a 34% market share on ground transport to Oslo Airport.

Vy 

Vy (formerly NSB) uses Gardermeon Line for express and some regional trains north of Oslo. This includes five daily departures to Trondheim (including one NSB Night Train). The line is operated by two regional services, the R10 service between Drammen and Lillehammer, the R11 service between Skien/Larvik and Eidsvoll, as well as the local service, L12 between Kongsberg and Eidsvoll. These services is carried out with Type 74 for R10 and R11, and Type 75 for line L12. Both trains are capable of  operation. The southernmost part of the line is used by commuter trains heading to the Kongsvinger Line. These trains divert from the Gardermoen Line at Lillestrøm. Also the commuter trains operating to Dal along the Hoved Line use the Gardermoen Line until Lillestrøm.

Other services 
Because there is a parallel line, the Hoved Line running all the way from Oslo S to Eidsvoll, some trains can choose to use this line instead. This is primarily done by some commuter trains, as well as all freight trains. The only exception to this are trains hauling jet fuel to the airport, which have to use the Gardermoen Line from Kløfta. This service is provided by CargoNet.

The Swedish state railways, SJ also operate on the southern part of Gardermoen on their intercity services X 2000. This was for some years provided by Linx, a joint venture between SJ and NSB, using X2 stock, but the company was later dissolved.

Stations

See also 

 High-speed rail in Norway

References

Notes

Bibliography

External links 

 
 Jernbane.net page on the Gardermoen Line 

 
Oslo
High-speed railway lines in Norway
Flytoget
Railway lines in Oslo
Railway lines in Viken
Railway lines opened in 1998
Electric railways in Norway
1998 establishments in Norway
Oslo Airport, Gardermoen